River terrapin may refer to:

Northern river terrapin (Batagur baska)
Southern river terrapin (Batagur affinis)

Animal common name disambiguation pages